The 2023 South Australian National Football League season (officially the SANFL Hostplus League) is the 144th season of the South Australian National Football League (SANFL), the highest-level Australian rules football competition in South Australia. The season will commence on 31 March and conclude with the Grand Final on 24 September.

Fixture
 For results see here

Ladder

Finals series

Qualifying and Elimination Finals

Semi-finals

Preliminary final

Grand Final

See also
 2023 SANFL Women's League season

References 

South Australian National Football League seasons
SANFL